Hockey Club Lugano, often abbreviated to HC Lugano or HCL, is a professional ice hockey club based in Lugano, Switzerland. The team competes in the National League (NL) and has won seven Swiss championships.

History
The founding of HC Lugano took place on 11 February 1941, when they participated on Muzzano Lake their first games against Ambrì, Muzzano, Massagno and Paradiso. On 1 December 1957, the first artificial ice rink was opened, at the Pista La Resega. Among those present was also the man who, 30 years later, was to take HC Lugano to the top of Swiss and international hockey: Geo Mantegazza, an engineer by profession, who had done the static calculations of the Resega and thus the first contacts had with the family earning the club the nickname of the "Bianconeri" acknowledging their Italian speaking heritage.

In 1963–64, Lugano rose to the National League B, most notably through the contributions of defender Elwyn Friedrich and Forward Roland Bernasconi, both national players and Swiss champions with Villars. In the 1970–71 season, the Bianconeri's promotion to the tope flight National League A was realised for the first time in franchise history, playing two seasons before returning to the NLB.

In the 1981–82 season Lugano returned, together with Ambrì, back in the NLA. In the 1982–83 season, Mantegazza hired Swedish coach John Slettvoll, who won numerous championships in his tenure.

Venue

The Pista La Resega hockey arena in Lugano is primarily used for ice hockey and is the home arena of HC Lugano, HC Lugano Ladies Team, HC Lugano-Ceresio and HC Porza. It was built in 1995, after the demolition of the previous one, and can hold 8,000 people.

Honors

Champions
NL Championship (7): 1986, 1987, 1988, 1990, 1999, 2003, 2006
SL Championship (1): 1982

Runners-up
NL Championship (8): 1985, 1989, 1991, 2000, 2001, 2004, 2016, 2018
Spengler Cup (3): 1991, 2015, 2016

Season-by-season records

Players

Current roster

Honored members

Franchise records and leaders

All-time scoring leaders

Team records
HC Lugano records in the Swiss National League A.

HC Lugano Ladies Team
 
The HC Lugano Ladies Team is a semi-professional women's ice hockey team that competes in the Swiss Women's A League. The club was officially founded on May 22, 1990. They won the Swiss Championship on 2006, 2007, 2009 and 2010.
 
In 2007, the HC Lugano Ladies Team qualified for the final round of the IIHF European Women's Champions Cup and even won the bronze medal 2010.

References

External links

 
Ice hockey teams in Switzerland
HC Lugano
HC Lugano
Ice hockey clubs established in 1941
1941 establishments in Switzerland
Swiss Women's League teams